The 1949 Florida Gators football team represented the University of Florida during the 1949 college football season. The season was Raymond Wolf's fourth and last as the head coach of the Florida Gators football team. Wolf's 1949 Florida Gators finished 4–5–1 overall and 1–4–1 in the Southeastern Conference (SEC), placing tenth of twelve SEC teams, and ending the Gators' "Golden Era."

Schedule
The highlight of the 1949 season was the Gators' 28–7 upset of the Georgia Bulldogs. Led by halfback Chuck Hunsinger, who rushed for 171 yards and three touchdowns, and team captain Jimmy Kynes, who was the defensive star and played every minute of the sixty-minute game, the Gators beat the Dawgs for the first time since 1940.

Mr. Two Bits
The otherwise lackluster season is notable for the beginning of the Mr. Two Bits tradition. Tampa insurance salesman George Edmondson, Jr., a former Citadel student, was in attendance at the season opening game against his former school and was struck by the lack of support shown by the fans at Florida Field. Feeling sorry for Florida's players, he began leading his section in the traditional "two bits" cheer. The Gators won, and the cheer was so well received that Edmonson returned to Gainesville later in the season to lead it again. This began a decades-long tradition, as Edmonson would continue to lead the cheer from the stands and (eventually) from the field as "Mr. Two Bits" until his retirement from the role in 2008. Since then, Gator "celebrities" and selected students have filled the role.

Postseason
After Wolf left Gainesville, he returned to his alma mater, Texas Christian University, where he became a long-time administrator.

References

Florida
Florida Gators football seasons
Florida Gators football